Catherine Willis may refer to:
Catherine Willis, founder of Urban Strings Columbus Youth Orchestra
Katherine Willis, American actress
Catherine Willis Gray, born Catherine Grey, princess of Naples
Katherine J. Willis, biologist

See also
Willis (surname)